The SIKKA Art Fair is an annual event created by Dubai Culture & Arts Authority in 2011 as a commissioned art exhibition to showcase emerging artists from the United Arab Emirates. Originally focused on visual arts only but later widened its scope to cover film screenings, music, talks and workshops. Sikka takes place in Al Fahidi Historical Neighbourhood (al Bastakiya), The Arabic word sikka means alleyway.

Exhibitions
 2011: Held between March 14 to March 21 
 2012: Hosted between March 15–25, the 24 finalists artists were selected by a committee chaired by Ebtisam Abdulaziz, Rami Farook, Khalid Al Najjar, together with Antonia Carver, Fair Director, Art Dubai, and Salem Belyouha.
 2013 : The third edition held between March 14 to March 24.
 2014 : Co-curated by Wafa Hasher Al Maktoum, Founder and Director of FN Designs, Japanese architect Kayoko Iemura, and assisted co curated by Yusaka Imamura. The exhibition was held between 14–24 March which later extended to 14 April 2014.
 2015: Curated by Jalal Luqman, featuring artists such as Mattar Bin Lahej, Abdul Qader Al Rais and Dr.Najat Makki. Hosted between 14 March to 24 March 2015.

References

External links
 

2011 establishments in the United Arab Emirates
Recurring events established in 2011
Art festivals in the United Arab Emirates
Spring (season) events in the United Arab Emirates
Events in the Arab world
Culture in Dubai
Arab art scene